Alexander "Sasha" Viktorovich Abt (born October 22, 1976) is a Russian figure skater and coach. He is a two-time European medalist and placed fifth at the 2002 Winter Olympics.

Career
Abt's first experience with figure skating came at the age of six when his grandmother took him to a rink. Sergei Volkov coached him early on but he began suffering from cancer and sent Abt to be trained by Rafael Arutyunyan before he died. Soon after, Abt began to make a name for himself on the junior circuit and won the silver medal at the 1991 World Junior Championships.

Abt underwent surgery for a knee problem early in his career. Later, in the summer of 1996, he sustained a serious injury during an exhibition performance in Mexico – He crashed into the boards and cut into his right leg's quadriceps muscle with his left blade, keeping him in hospital for several weeks and off ice for six months. He was a late replacement at the 1997 European Championships, where he won the bronze medal.

Alexander placed fourth at the 1998 Russian Championships and was not named to the Olympic team. Later that year, he placed third at the European Championships, behind fellow countrymen Alexei Yagudin and Evgeni Plushenko and claimed the bronze medal. Abt underwent knee surgery in December 1998.

Abt had a sinus infection at the 2001 European Championships and underwent surgery in spring 2001 to remove a cyst from his sinuses. In June 2001, he moved to Lake Arrowhead, California, for training. Abt won the silver medal at the 2002 European Championships, and came in fifth at the 2002 Winter Olympics. Abt intended to retire following that season, but instead elected to continue competing. Having worked with Arutyunyan for eleven years, Abt decided to move to a new coach, Alexander Zhulin, in May 2002.

Abt won three Grand Prix medals, as well as his first (and only) Russian Championship in the 2002-03 season. He was forced to withdraw from the 2003 European Championships after injuring his landing ankle in practice a day before he was supposed to fly out, and took several months to recover. His last competition was the 2004 Russian Championships. He withdrew after placing fourth in the short program.

Abt retired from competition and participated in the Russian TV show Ice Age (2008). He played one of the main roles in a Russian soap opera about figure skating, My Hot Ice (2008–2009). Abt has skated in Japan for Prince Ice World and in Russia on the Ice Symphony tour. He coaches in New Jersey.

Personal life
In April 1999, Abt married former ice dancer Elena Pavlova, who competed with her brother Alexander Pavlov. They have one son, Makar, born in March 2000. The family now resides in New Jersey, in the United States.

Programs

Results

References

External links

 
 Official homepage of Alexander Abt

Navigation

Living people
1976 births
Russian male single skaters
Figure skaters at the 2002 Winter Olympics
Olympic figure skaters of Russia
Figure skaters from Moscow
European Figure Skating Championships medalists
World Junior Figure Skating Championships medalists
Universiade medalists in figure skating
Universiade bronze medalists for Russia
Competitors at the 1997 Winter Universiade